Snillfjord is a former municipality in Trøndelag county, Norway. The municipality existed from 1924 until its dissolution in 2020 when it was split between the municipalities of Hitra, Heim, and Orkland. It was part of the Fosen region.  The administrative centre of the municipality was the village of Krokstadøra.  Other villages in Snillfjord included Ytre Snillfjord, Hemnskjela, Selnes and Vutudal.

At the time of its dissolution in 2020, the  municipality was the 209th largest by area out of the 422 municipalities in Norway. Snillfjord was the 394th most populous municipality in Norway with a population of 987.

General information

The municipality of Snillfjord was established on 1 July 1924 when it was separated from the large municipality of Hemne.  The initial population was 776. During the 1960s, there were many municipal mergers across Norway due to the work of the Schei Committee.  On 1 January 1964, the eastern part of the old municipality of Heim (population: 724) and the western part of the neighboring municipality of Agdenes (population: 196) were merged with Snillfjord (population: 681) to form a new, larger municipality of Snillfjord.  On 1 January 1995, the Midtun area of Agdenes municipality (population: 21) was transferred to Snillfjord.  A road to the area had recently been built, but it connected to Snillfjord and not Agdenes, so it was decided to switch to the other municipality due to the newly opened road connection.

On 1 January 2018, the municipality switched from the old Sør-Trøndelag county to the new Trøndelag county.

On 1 January 2020, the municipality of Snillfjord was dissolved and its lands were split between its three neighboring municipalities.  The northwestern portion of Snillfjord joined the municipality of Hitra, the southwestern Vennastranda area joined the new municipality of Heim, and the rest joined the new municipality of Orkland.

Name
The municipality is named after the Snillfjorden which flowed through the municipality. The first element is probably an old river name of the Snilldalselva.

Coat of arms
The coat of arms was granted on 31 August 1990 and it was in use until 1 January 2020 when the municipality was dissolved. The official blazon is "Vert, a pitchfork argent". This means the arms have a green field (background) and the charge is a pitchfork. The pitchfork has a tincture of argent which means it is commonly colored white, but if it is made out of metal, then silver is used. This design was chosen to symbolize the importance of agriculture in the municipality. The arms were designed by Einar H. Skjervold. The municipal flag has the same design as the coat of arms.

Churches
The Church of Norway had one parish within the municipality of Snillfjord. It is part of the Orkdal prosti (deanery) in the Diocese of Nidaros.

Government
While it existed, this municipality was responsible for primary education (through 10th grade), outpatient health services, senior citizen services, unemployment and other social services, zoning, economic development, and municipal roads. During its existence, this municipality was governed by a municipal council of elected representatives, which in turn elected a mayor. The municipality fell under the Trøndelag District Court and the Frostating Court of Appeal.

Municipal council
The municipal council of Snillfjord is made up of 17 representatives that are elected to four year terms.  The party breakdown of the final municipal council was as follows:

Mayors
The mayors of Snillfjord:

1924–1928: Haakon Myrholt (V)
1929–1931: Knut Snildal (Bp)
1932–1934: Sigurd Aune (Bp)
1935–1940: Arne O. Heggvik (V)
1941-1941: Anders Krogstad (NS)
1941–1942: Per P. Ven (NS)
1942–1945: Sigurd Aune (NS)
1945–1955: Arne O. Heggvik (V)
1956–1959: Einar Selnes (KrF)
1960–1967: John Snildal (Ap)
1968–1979: Jon Selnes (Sp)
1980–1983: Einar Berg (Sp)
1984–1995: Kåre Berdal (Ap)
1995–2000: Nils Gunnar Vuttudal (Sp)
2000–2007: Anders Krokstad (Sp)
2007–2011: John Lernes (H)
2011–2013: John Geir Stølan (Sp)
2013–2015: Anders Krokstad (Sp)
2015–2019: John Lernes (Ap)

Geography

The municipality of Snillfjord was located south of the Trondheimsleia and east of the Hemnfjorden.  The Åstfjorden and Snillfjorden flowed east from the Hemnfjorden into the municipality.  The lake Våvatnet was located on the border with Orkdal in the southeast.  The island of Hemnskjela lies in the Trondheimsleia in the north, and it is the southern entrance to the Hitra Tunnel.

The  municipality of Snillfjord was surrounded by four municipalities.  The municipality of Hemne lies to the southwest, Hitra is to the northwest, Agdenes to the northeast, and Orkdal to the southeast.

See also
List of former municipalities of Norway

References

External links

Municipal fact sheet from Statistics Norway 

 
Hitra
Heim, Norway
Orkland
Former municipalities of Norway
1924 establishments in Norway
2020 disestablishments in Norway
Populated places disestablished in 2020